Tony Newton may refer to:
Tony Newton, Baron Newton of Braintree (1937–2012), British Conservative politician
Tony Newton (musician) (born 1948), musician, producer and arranger from Detroit
Tony Newton (producer) (born 1979), film maker and author